Wat Ratchanatdaram is a buddhist temple (wat) located at the intersection between Ratchadamnoen Klang and Maha Chai Road, in Phra Nakhon district, Bangkok.

Meaning Temple of the Royal Niece, the temple was built to the order of King Nangklao (Rama III) for his granddaughter, Princess Somanass Waddhanawathy in 1846.

Loha Prasat
Loha Prasat, which means iron castle or iron monastery (โลหะปราสาท), is composed of five towers, of which the outer, middle and the center towers contain large black iron spires. The 37 virtues that are required to reach enlightenment are signified by 37 golden spires. The  multi-tiered structure consists of 3 levels, the bottom one has 24 spires, the middle one 12 and the top level has 1 spire.

There were two other similar structures which previously existed in the world. Modelled after the earlier ones in India and Anuradhapura, Sri Lanka, both of which no longer exist. It contained 1,000 rooms with a golden spire on top. Another one, built in Sri Lanka, had nine floors and the roof was thatched with copper. Precious stones, wood and ivory decorated  the walls.

The design of Loha Prasat almost appears Burmese, but in fact this is a copy of old Buddhist design found in Sri Lanka. In the early nineteenth century, it was begun construct by King Rama III.

A pyramid like structure created by the outer building is the widest, The next one smaller than the previous one. At the ground floor level of the tower you will find a labyrinth environment was supported by a great number of columns. Plenty of pictures are describing the history of structure in some of the corridors were installed in late 2007.

The Loha Prasat was modeled after the one in Anuradhapura, Sri Lanka. It is the only one of its kind that exists today. It was submitted to UNESCO to be a World Heritage Site in 2005.

Gallery

References
http://bangkokforvisitors.com/ratanakosin/loha-prasat/ 
travel.com/temples/wat-ratchanadda.html 
Phlainoi, S. (2555). Lao ruang Bangkok chabap sombunnn. Krung Thep...: Phimkham.

External links

 Loha Prasat - The Metal Castle
 Wat Ratchanadda (The Loha Prasat)
 Wat Ratchanatdaram Worawihan

Ratchanadda
Religious buildings and structures completed in 1846
Phra Nakhon district
Registered ancient monuments in Bangkok